The Dr. Peters Group, registered in Dortmund, is an investment firm that has been placing and managing tangible assets since 1975 in the legal form of a limited partnership. The investment targets are mobile and immobile goods of the real economy such as ships, real estate and aircraft; Dr. Peters is no longer active on the secondary market for life insurances. The funds are offered to investors in Germany and Austria via banks and free agents. Since 2013, the Dr. Peters Group has been designing funds for national and international institutional investors. The group is a member of the Bundesverband Sachwerte und Investmentvermögen e.V.

Development of the Company

Start of Real Estate Investments
The first fund was launched and invested in a retirement home in Dortmund. Since 1977, the company has directed  the product brand DS-Fonds (DS = Dynamism & Safety). Until the end of the 1990s, the funds invested in different real estate segments such as hotels, care real estate, shopping centres and office buildings in Germany.

Expansion through Ship Investments
Beginning in 1990, the company invested in cargo ships which formed the focus of investment until 2007. After financing cooling ships, container ships and product tankers, the company introduced and established KG-financing of tankers subject to the long-term charter concept on the German market in 1998. From 2001 onwards, investments in bulk carriers, large container ships and foreign real estate (USA) followed.

The Present Investment Focus: Aircraft Funds
Since 2007, the company has been investing in the aircraft field, among others by purchasing aircraft of the type Airbus A380-800. This established the Dr. Peters Group as the pioneer in aircraft investments in Germany with 17 current aircraft investments. Forecast dividends have all been paid until now. The company has become the market leader in Germany with a total placed capital of 1.03 billion euros.

Problems Caused by the Financing and Shipping Crisis
Currently, several of the ship funds suffer partly serious financial difficulties due to the financial and shipping crisis. Disbursements are currently partly no longer made. Insolvencies of funds have also occurred – e.g. Fund 111. Investors in other funds were requested by the fund companies of the issuing house to repay their dividend payments. This was partly stopped by the Federal Court of Justice with detailed arguments; in the cases decided to date, not the funds themselves but only their creditors could demand return of the disbursements.

Subsidiaries of the Dr. Peters Group

Dr. Peters Asset Finance GmbH & Co. KG Kapitalverwaltungsgesellschaft (KVG)
The German Capital Investment Act (KAGB) introduced in 2014, requires that the administrator of Alternative Investment Funds (AIF) needs a permit from the Federal Financial Supervisory Authority (abbreviation BaFin) for his activities. In addition, he must demonstrate and observe continuous risk controlling, liquidity management and extensive organisational and documentation duties for the administration of Alternative Investment Funds. The statutory compliance of the administrators of AIF is continuously examined and monitored by BaFin. By founding the Dr. Peters Asset Finance GmbH & Co. KG Kapitalverwaltungsgesellschaft in May 2013 the corporate group has adapted fully to the new regulations. This permits the further development of the group with new own fully regulated products. On 16 April 2014 Dr. Peters Asset Finance obtained the permit for activities as a capital administration company ("Service KVG") from BaFin and therefore already implements all new regulations and requirements of the legislator.

Dr. Peters GmbH & Co. Emissionshaus KG
Dr. Peters GmbH & Co. Emissionshaus KG operates as a service provider for the KVG and is responsible for the sales and marketing of newly conceived funds. For this purpose, the issuer has a large network of banks and independent distribution partners across the entire territory of the Federal Republic of Germany.

Dr. Peters GmbH & Co. KG
Dr. Peters GmbH & Co. KG is the administrative unit of the group. Its area of responsibility is the management of fund companies not administered by the KVG, all investor communications, all tax issues as well as accounting and finance and bookkeeping and accounting both for the funds and for the entire group.

DS Aviation GmbH & Co. KG
The asset management in the field of aircraft is performed by DS Aviation which is therefore responsible for monitoring all aircraft investments of the Dr. Peters Group. DS Aviation is assigned within the group to acquire aircraft and close all contracts with the respective partners in the aircraft industry. DS Aviation thereby operates as the service provider for Dr. Peters Asset Finance GmbH & Co. KG Kapitalverwaltungsgesellschaft and external customers.

DS Skytech Ltd.
DS Skytech Ltd. with registered office in Great Britain is a joint venture of DS Aviation GmbH & Co. KG and Skytech AIC. DS Skytech is responsible with its own engineers and aviation experts for technical asset management, i.e. for example the ongoing control of the status of the aircraft.

DS Schifffahrt GmbH & Co. KG
DS Schiffahrt GmbH & Co. KG (DS Schiffahrt) is responsible for the technical and commercial asset management of the ships in the group. The company’s performance range extends from management and freighting through controlling to construction supervision, and from the compilation of expert opinions to the selection of a crew. The fleet operated by DS Schiffahrt includes container ships of the size from 500 to 6,500 TEU as well as oil and product tankers of all size classes. DS Schiffahrt has a team of app. 40 employees on land and more than 500 navigators. It also offers its services to companies which are not part of the group.

DS Immobilien GmbH & Co. KG
DS Immobilien is responsible for the real estate management of the Dr. Peters Group. It fulfils commercial tasks as well as the asset bookkeeping, claims management and daily controlling. In addition, DS Immobilien is responsible for a range of building services.

Financed Tangible Asset Portfolio

References

Financial services companies of Germany
Financial services companies established in 1975
1975 establishments in West Germany